The X Factor: Celebrity is a British celebrity special edition of The X Factor which premiered on 12 October 2019 on ITV. It is a revamped version of the 2006 celebrity format The X Factor: Battle of the Stars. Simon Cowell, Nicole Scherzinger and Louis Walsh judged this series, with Dermot O'Leary presenting the series and Vick Hope hosting Xtra Bites on YouTube.

The format for the series was announced in 2019, after The X Factor was contracted until 2020. The celebrity lineup was announced on 30 September 2019. On 30 November, Megan McKenna won the series with 46.3% of the vote, with Max and Harvey finishing in second place and Jenny Ryan in third place.

Background and judges

The series' predecessor, The X Factor: Battle of the Stars aired in 2006 as a celebrity incarnation of The X Factor. It was reported on 26 August 2006 that Cowell had axed Battle of the Stars, describing it as "pointless" and adding "we are never going to do it again." However, Cowell later stated in an interview with The Sun on 30 November 2018 that he would consider reviving the show for a second series as a charity special.

The series was first reported in early 2019, as the main series was being put on hiatus due to declining ratings. On 7 July 2019, Walsh spoke about the return of the series, stating, "I go to Los Angeles on Tuesday, I go to Simon's house in Malibu, it's me, Simon and Nicole, we're doing the celebrity one." On 22 October 2019, it was revealed that Vick Hope would host Xtra Bites on YouTube, each episode premiered after each live show.

The format of the series differs heavily than Battle of the Stars to bring it more in line with the main series. Notable differences between this series and Battle of the Stars are instead of competing for charity, the acts are competing to win a record contract with Syco Music, and the live shows, instead of being aired daily, are aired every Saturday night, allowing more time inbetween shows for the acts to develop their artistry.

Acts
A teaser, released in September 2019, teased the potential contestants of the series, of which include: a film star, model, online influencers, professional dancer, social media stars and a soap star. The full line-up was revealed on 30 September 2019. Cowell mentored the Groups, Walsh mentored the 16-30s and Scherzinger mentored the Over 31s. During auditions, Cowell's America's Got Talent co-judge Howie Mandel and American Idol co-judge Randy Jackson appeared as guest judges.

Key:
 – Winner
 – Runner-up
 – 3rd place
 – Eliminated in the live shows
 – Eliminated in the auditions

Notes

Auditions
The audition process took place in Los Angeles, California. The celebrity acts were all asked to meet with O'Leary in a location where they then spent two days with the production team working on vocal training and song choices. They then auditioned for Cowell, Walsh and Scherzinger at a house party in Malibu consisting of various singers, songwriters, record producers and talent judges for the acts to perform in front of.

Some of the guest judges that the celebrities got to perform in front of were as follows:

Vinnie Jones, who was due to take part in the show, was unable to fly to Los Angeles for his audition due to the death of his wife Tanya Terry on 6 July 2019. Cowell personally called Jones two months later and offered him an unconditional place in the live shows.

Notes

Live shows

Results summary
Colour key

 Although Ryan was eliminated by Scherzinger, Ryan later returned as the thirteenth finalist.
 Cowell was not required to vote as there was already a majority.
 Walsh was not required to vote as there was already a majority.
 The voting percentages in the final's second vote do not add up to 100%, owing to the freezing of votes. V5 received 4.2% of the final vote.

Week 1 (26 October)
Theme: Express Yourself

Judges' votes to eliminate

 Walsh: Martin Bashir - backed his own act, Olivia Olson.
 Scherzinger: Olivia Olson - backed her own act, Martin Bashir.
 Cowell: Olivia Olson - concluded that the public would like to see Bashir through to next week more.

Week 2 (2 November)
Musical Guest: James Arthur ("Quite Miss Home")

Judges' votes to eliminate
 Walsh: Martin Bashir - backed his own act, Jonny Labey.
 Scherzinger: Jonny Labey - backed her own act, Martin Bashir.
 Cowell abstained from voting as he wanted to hear the public's opinion and chose to take the vote to deadlock.

With the acts in the bottom two receiving one vote each, the result went to deadlock and reverted to the earlier public vote. Jonny Labey was eliminated as the act with the fewest public votes.

Week 3 (9 November)

Judges' votes to eliminate
 Walsh: No Love Lost - based his decision on whom he thought would sell more records.
 Scherzinger: No Love Lost - said that she liked V5 more consistently throughout the competition.
 Cowell was not required to vote as there was already a majority and did not say how he would have voted as both were his own acts. However, in response to No Love Lost's elimination, he said that he would organise a public vote to bring back one of the eliminated acts for the final.

However, voting statistics revealed that No Love Lost received more votes than V5 which meant that if the result went to deadlock, No Love Lost would have advanced to the quarter-final and V5 would have been eliminated.

Week 4: Quarter-Final (16 November)
Musical Guest: Lizzo ("Good as Hell")

At the beginning of the show, Cowell stated that Safe Seats would no longer be used due to negative viewer reception, therefore all acts would face the public vote.

This is also the only live show with one contestant going home.

Shortly before the judges voted, Jones announced that he did not wish to obstruct McHale's progress and requested to withdraw.
Judges' votes to eliminate
 Scherzinger: Kevin McHale - backed her own act, Vinnie Jones.
 Walsh: Vinnie Jones - backed his own act, Kevin McHale.
 Cowell: Kevin McHale - Disregarded Jones' request to leave and said he was going with his heart, believing that Jones still had a chance of winning the competition.

Week 5: Semi-Final (23 November)
Theme: Movies
Musical Guest: Louis Tomlinson ("Don't Let It Break Your Heart")

At the start of the show, O'Leary announced that Cowell's request for a wildcard vote had to be declined, and that four finalists would be found amongst the remaining six acts.

Judges' votes to eliminate
 Scherzinger: Try Star - opted to save V5 as she was "all about girl power".
 Cowell: Try Star - commended Try Star on their overall progress in the competition as they had not been singers before, but ultimately felt that V5 had a better chance of being successful outside the show.
 Walsh was not required to vote as there was already a majority and did not say how he would have voted.

However, voting statistics revealed that Try Star received more votes than V5 which meant that if the result went to deadlock, Try Star would have advanced to the final and V5 would have been eliminated.

Week 6: Final (30 November)
Theme: Christmas; Song of the Series
Musical guest:  Kevin McHale, Jenny Ryan, The CutKelvins, Leon Mallett, Tabby Callaghan, Spencer Sutherland ("How Will I Know"/"Take Me to the Clouds Above"); and The Pussycat Dolls ("Buttons" / "When I Grow Up" / "Don't Cha" / "React")

Following the announcement that McKenna had won, she performed her winner's single, "It Must Have Been Love".

Reception

Ratings

Notes
  The ratings over a 7-day period, including the broadcasts on ITV and streaming through ITV Hub using BARB's four-screen dashboard system (includes viewers watching on tablets/smartphones).
  The ITV rank for the programme compared to other ITV broadcasts in the week.

References

2010s British music television series
2010s British reality television series
2019 British television series debuts
2019 British television series endings
ITV (TV network) original programming
Television series by Fremantle (company)
Celebrity